World tree is a form of axis mundi found in many mythologies.

World Tree may also refer to:

World Tree (role-playing game), an anthropomorphic fantasy role-playing game
World Tree Day, or Arbor Day
Mesoamerican world tree, a prevalent motif in pre-Columbian cultures of Mesoamerica
The main setting of the PBS show It's a Big Big World